Quaking Bridge is a bridge over the Castle Mill Stream in the city of Oxford, England. It connects to St Thomas' Street and Paradise Street and Tidmarsh Lane to the east. It is close to Oxford Castle, immediately to the east. To the north on the Castle Mill Stream are Pacey's Bridge and Hythe Bridge. To the south is Swan Bridge.

There has been a bridge at this location from at least the late 13th century. Quaking Bridge was first mentioned in 1297, but is probably much older. It crossed the Castle Mill Stream immediately west of Oxford Castle, on a road that connected Oxford and St Thomas's parish (hence St Thomas' Street here now) before the castle existed. The Canons of Oseney Abbey used it each day for services in St George's Chapel at the castle. The responsibility for the bridge's upkeep was meant to be that of the King. The bridge was originally wooden. In 1821, it had three arches and open timberwork acting as railings. The bridge was replaced with an iron one in 1835.

The name of the bridge may derive from its former unsafe condition.

References

External links
 Quaking bridge Water Levels, 8 June 2008

Bridges completed in 1835
Bridges in Oxford